Justice Stockton may refer to:
Lacon D. Stockton, justice of the Iowa Supreme Court
Richard Stockton (Continental Congressman), chief justice of the New Jersey Supreme Court
Richard Stockton (Mississippi politician), associate justice of the Supreme Court of Mississippi
Thomas Stockton (judge) (1609–1674), English-born judge who held office in seventeenth-century Ireland